Thyrogonia hampsoni is a moth in the subfamily Arctiinae. It was described by Sergius G. Kiriakoff in 1953. It is found in the Democratic Republic of the Congo.

References

Moths described in 1953
Arctiinae
Endemic fauna of the Democratic Republic of the Congo